The 2008 Tokyo Marathon was the second edition of the annual marathon race in Tokyo, Japan and was held on Sunday, 17 February. The men's race was won by Switzerland's Viktor Röthlin in a time of 2:07:23, while the women's race was won by German Claudia Dreher in 2:35:35.

Results

Men

Women

References

 Results. Association of Road Racing Statisticians. Retrieved 2020-04-05.

External links

 Official website

Tokyo Marathon
Tokyo
2008 in Tokyo
Tokyo Marathon
Tokyo Marathon